Ivan Terziyski (born 6 December 1980) is a Bulgarian footballer who plays as a midfielder.

Terziyski began his footballing career with CSKA Sofia youth team, where in 1998 was a team-mate with Dimitar Berbatov. Terziyski was a captain of the youth team, before moved to Akademik Svishtov in 1999. He also played for Vihar Gorublyane, Conegliano and Minyor Pernik. In 2007 Terziyski signed with Sportist Svoge.

External links 
 Profile at football24.bg

Bulgarian footballers
1980 births
Living people
First Professional Football League (Bulgaria) players
PFC Minyor Pernik players
FC Sportist Svoge players

Association football midfielders